Geoffrey of Rohan ( 1190 – 15 September 1221) was fifth Viscount of Rohan

Life and reign 
Geoffrey was the eldest son of Alan IV, Viscount of Rohan and Mabilla of Fougères, and the brother of Alix, Catherine, Conan, Oliver I and Alan V.

He married firstly Margaret, daughter of Constance of Brittany and her third husband Guy of Thouars.

After Margaret's death, Geoffrey married Gervaise of Dinan, Dame of Bécherel. She was the only daughter and heiress of Alan of Dinan and Clemence of Fougères.

Geoffrey died on 15 September 1221. He had no issue and was succeeded by his younger brother Oliver.

Notes and references 

House of Rohan
Viscounts of Rohan
1190s births
1221 deaths